Belgium competed at the 1928 Summer Olympics in Amsterdam, Netherlands. 187 competitors, 176 men and 11 women, took part in 90 events in 15 sports.

Medalists

Athletics

32 athletes, 24 men and 8 women, represented Belgium in 1928. It was the nation's 5th appearance in the sport. It was the first time women's events were held in the sport. 

 Men

 Track & road events

 Field events

Combined events – Decathlon

 Women

 Track & road events

 Field events

Boxing

Two men represented Belgium in boxing in 1928. It was the nation's third appearance in the sport. Both men reached the round of 16 (Sartos by winning his first bout, Anneet with a bye), but were defeated there.

Cycling

Eight cyclists, all men, represented Belgium in 1928. It was the nation's 6th appearance in the sport, in which Belgium had competed every time that Belgium had sent an Olympic team. For the first time since 1912, Belgium won no cycling medals.

Road

Track

 Time trial

 Match races

Equestrian

Nine riders, all men, represented Belgium in the equestrian events in 1928. It was Belgium's 5th appearance in the sport; Belgium was one of 3 nations (along with France and the United States) to compete in every Olympic equestrian competition to date. For the second time in a row, Belgium won no medals.

 Dressage

 Eventing

 Jumping

Fencing

21 fencers, 18 men and 3 women, represented Belgium in 1928. It was the nation's 6th appearance in the sport. Women fencers represented Belgium for the first time; Belgium had not had any entrants in the inaugural women's fencing competition in 1924. Belgium had three 4th-place finishes and four other final pool competitors, but won no medals. It was the first time since 1900 (Belgium's first appearance) that the nation failed to medal in the sport.

Football

Summary

 Men's tournament

Belgium competed in men's football for the fourth time in 1928. The team beat Luxembourg in the round of 16 but was defeated by eventual silver medalists Argentina in the quarterfinals.

 Team roster

Round of 16

Quarterfinals

Consolation tournament, First round

Hockey

Belgium competed in men's field hockey for the second time. The team, which had won bronze in the previous tournament in 1920, reached the bronze medal match in 1928. There, they lost to Germany and finished in 4th place.

Summary

Men's tournament

Team roster

Group play

Bronze match

Modern pentathlon

Belgium had the maximum number of pentathletes, three men, in 1928. It was the nation's 2nd appearance in the sport.

Rowing

21 men represented Belgium in rowing in 1928. It was the nation's 6th appearance in the sport, matching Canada and Great Britain for the most. Belgium entered boats in 6 of the 7 events. None of the boats reached the final in its event, but the coxed pair boat won a bronze medal by being one of the three boats to reach the semifinals. It was Belgium's first medal in the sport since 1912.

Sailing

6 men represented Belgium in sailing in 1928. It was the nation's 4th appearance in the sport. Belgium had boats in 2 of the 3 events. 

 Dinghy

 6 metre and 8 metre classes

Swimming

Five men represented Belgium in swimming in 1928. It was the nation's 6th appearance in the sport, in which Belgium competed each time Belgium had appeared at the Summer Olympics. None of the Belgian swimmers reached the finals of their events.

Water polo

Belgium competed in men's water polo for the 6th time. For the first time, Belgium failed to win a medal; the team fell to eventual gold medalist Germany in the quarterfinals.

Summary

Men's tournament

 Team roster

 Round of 16

 Quarterfinals

Weightlifting

Eight men represented Belgium in weightlifting in 1928. It was the nation's 3rd appearance in the sport.

Wrestling

13 men represented Belgium in wrestling in 1928. Belgium was one of 3 nations (along with Finland and France) to have a wrestler in each event. It was the nation's 5th appearance in the sport. Spapen won Belgium's only wrestling medal in 1928, a silver.

 Freestyle

 Greco-Roman

Art competitions

References

External links
Official Olympic Reports
International Olympic Committee results database

Nations at the 1928 Summer Olympics
1928
Olympics